Rinbung County is a county at the northeastern boundary of the prefecture-level city of Xigazê in the Tibet Autonomous Region.

Town and townships
 Dê'gyiling Town
 Chagba Township
 Kangxung Township
 Moin Township
 Bartang Township
 Pusum Township
 Qewa Township
 Ramba Township
 Rinbung Township

External links 

 
Counties of Tibet
Shigatse